The  consists of the Japanese cities Tokyo, Kawasaki, and Yokohama. The term is mostly used to describe these cities as one industrial region. 
Keihin is derived from the second character of Tōkyō, which can be read kyō or kei, and the second character of Yokohama, which can be read hin or hama.

The Keihin region is part of the larger Kantō region.

See also
Keihanshin
Keihin Electric Express Railway
Keihin-Tōhoku Railway Line
Keihin Ferry Boat
List of regions of Japan
Japan

External links 
 Britannica Concise Encyclopedia: Keihin Industrial Zone

Kantō region